Robert Grant Marshall (1876 – 1962) was a Scottish footballer who played as an outside-right, notably for Liverpool and Portsmouth.

Marshall started his career in his native Scotland with Leith Athletic. He left the club in 1897 to transfer to Liverpool, of the English First Division. Marshall struggled to establish himself as a regular at the club and, in 1899, transferred to Portsmouth. He went on to make 131 appearances, scoring 19 goals and helping the side win the Southern Football League in the 1901–02 season.

He was unrelated to John Marshall, who scored for Third Lanark in the 1889 Scottish Cup Final against Celtic.

Notes

References
Matthews, Tony (2006) Who's Who of Liverpool, Mainstream Publishing, 

1876 births
1962 deaths
Footballers from Edinburgh
Scottish footballers
Leith Athletic F.C. players
Liverpool F.C. players
Portsmouth F.C. players
Brighton & Hove Albion F.C. players
Association football outside forwards
St Bernard's F.C. players
Southern Football League players
Scottish Football League players
English Football League players